Janet Cox-Rearick (June 28, 1930 - November 27, 2018) was an American art historian, Distinguished Professor of Art History at the City University of New York.

Early life and education 
Born Janet Pearson Cox in Bronxville, New York to Vernon Cox, a schoolmaster at St. Bernard's School in Manhattan, and Mary Bostwick Cox, a Wellesley College graduate in Art History. She attended Bronxville High School (graduating in 1948) and Wellesley College (class of 1952). Though she was working as a model and preparing for a career in fashion merchandising, her encounter with Sydney J. Freedberg, her professor at Wellesley, convinced her to follow a career in art history. She followed Freedberg to Harvard, where she did her MA and PhD under his supervision. She won a two-year Fulbright Fellowship in 1954, which led to her meeting with a young opera student, Anna Moffo, who became her lifelong friend.

In 1961–63 she was a member of the first class of Fellows to Villa I Tatti, The Harvard Center for Italian Renaissance Studies. (The other Fellows appointed in that year were Eric Cochrane, Curtis Shell, John Freccero, and David Herlihy.) She held appointments at I Tatti again in 1975–76 and 1990–91.

Scholarly work 
Her dissertation, The Drawings of Pontormo, was published as a book (2 volumes) in 1963.

Her later books include: Dynasty and Destiny in Medici Art; Bronzino's Chapel of Eleonora in the Palazzo Vecchio; The Collections of Francois I: Royal Treasures; and Giulio Romano. She co-curated the 1999 exhibition The Drawings of Bronzino at the Metropolitan Museum of Art.

She taught at Wellesley College, then soon after graduation worked as a curator in the Department of Prints and Drawings of the Art Institute of Chicago. She then became a lecturer at the Frick Collection before being hired, on the recommendation of Leo Steinberg, to teach Italian Renaissance art at Hunter College. She remained at Hunter College for over forty years, and later taught at the Graduate Center of the City University of New York.

She received the title of Distinguished Professor from the City University of New York.
For her work on Francois I, the French government awarded her a knighthood, naming her a Chevalier des Arts et des Lettres.

Personal life 
She married three times, first to the art historian William Roger Rearick. Her second husband was H. Wiley Hitchcock, a scholar of American music. Her third husband was the art historian Louis Alexander Waldman.

Bibliography 
 Bambach, Carmen,   Janet Cox-Rearick, and George R. Goldner. The Drawings of Bronzino. New York: Metropolitan Museum of Art, 2010. 
 Janet Cox-Rearick, and Richard Aste. Giulio Romano, Master Designer: An Exhibition of Drawings in Celebration of the Five Hundredth Anniversary of His Birth. New York: Bertha and Karl Leubsdorf Art Gallery, Hunter College of the City University of New York, 1999. 
 Cox-Rearick, Janet,The Collection of Francis I: Royal Treasures. New York: Harry N. Abrams, 1996. 
 Cox-Rearick, Janet. Bronzino's Chapel of Eleonora in the Palazzo Vecchio. Berkeley: University of California Press, 1993. According to WorldCat, the book is held in 622 libraries 
 Cox-Rearick, Janet. Dynasty and Destiny in Medici Art: Pontormo, Leo X, and the Two Cosimos. Princeton, N.J.: Princeton University Press, 1984. According to WorldCat, the book is held in 484 libraries 
 Cox-Rearick, Janet,The Drawings of Pontormo: A Catalogue Raisonné with Notes on the Paintings. New York: Hacker Art Books, 1981.

References 

1930 births
2018 deaths
American art historians
People from Bronxville, New York
American women historians
Harvard University alumni
Women art historians
Wellesley College alumni
Historians from New York (state)
Chevaliers of the Ordre des Arts et des Lettres
21st-century American women